Seefin Passage Tomb is an empty passage grave and National Monument located atop Seefin Hill, County Wicklow, Ireland.

Location

Seefin Passage Tomb is located atop Seefin in the Wicklow Mountains, just south of Kilbride Army Camp. Nearby Seefingan and Seahan mountains also have cairns atop them.

History

The tomb was built circa 3300 BC, during Ireland's Neolithic. It was excavated by R. A. Stewart Macalister in 1931, but no artefacts or human remains were found, suggesting that no-one was ever buried there, or that the remains were later removed.

Description
There are some carved decorations in lozenge shape, carved lines and quartz.

Photo gallery

References

National Monuments in County Wicklow
Archaeological sites in County Wicklow
Tombs in the Republic of Ireland